Hupa are a Native American people in northwestern California (including the Federally recognized Hoopa Valley Tribe).

Hupa or Hoopa can refer to:

 Hupa language, the Athabaskan language of the Hupa people
 Hupa traditional narratives
 , a United States Navy ship
 Hoopa, California, an unincorporated community Humboldt County, California, U.S.
 Hoopa Airport, a public airport in Humboldt County, California, U.S.
 Hoopa Valley, a valley along the Trinity River in northern California
 Trinity River (California), a major river in northwest California natively called "Hoopa" or "Hupa"
 Hoopa (Pokémon), a fictional species of Mythical Pokémon in the Pokémon series

See also 
 Chuppah, a wedding canopy in Judaism
 Hoopla (disambiguation)